Reg Weaver is an American labor leader who served as president of the National Education Association. He is vice president of Education International.

A graduate of Danville High School in Illinois, he holds degrees from Illinois State University and Roosevelt University. He completed his second term as NEA president on August 31, 2008.

References

External links

Illinois State University alumni
Roosevelt University alumni
American educators
Year of birth missing (living people)
Living people
Presidents of the National Education Association
People for the American Way people
American trade union leaders